The 1980 Ms. Olympia contest was an IFBB professional bodybuilding competition was held on August 30, 1980, at the Sheraton Hotel in Philadelphia, Pennsylvania. It was the 1st Ms. Olympia competition held.

Prize money
1st $5,000
Total: $10,000

Results

Notable events
 Ms. Olympia was originally known as Miss Olympia.
 Lorie Johnston was the youngest person to ever compete as a Ms. Olympia competition, at the age of 17 years.

See also
 1980 Mr. Olympia

References

External links
 Ms. Olympia Turns 30
 Competitor History of the Ms. Olympia

Ms Olympia, 1980
Ms. Olympia
Ms. Olympia
History of female bodybuilding